John George O'Hurley Jr. (born October 9, 1954) is an American actor, comedian, singer, author, game show host and television personality. He is known for his portrayal of J. Peterman on the NBC sitcom Seinfeld, and was the sixth host of the game show Family Feud from 2006 to 2010. He also hosted To Tell the Truth from 2000 to 2002 in syndication.

Early life
O'Hurley was born in Kittery, Maine, the son of Jean (February 14, 1930 – February 9, 2017), a housewife, and John O'Hurley Sr. (January 18, 1928 – February 1, 2020), an ear, nose, and throat surgeon. O'Hurley attended Natick High School in Natick, Massachusetts and Kingswood-Oxford School in West Hartford, Connecticut, but moved to DuBois, Pennsylvania in 9th grade and graduated from Providence College in 1976 with a BA in Theatre.  His older sister Carol died in 1970 at the age of 17 due to epileptic seizures, and so he performs charitable work for the Epilepsy Foundation. He has younger twin brothers, Bruce and Neal, and a younger sister, Susan.

Career

Seinfeld
On Seinfeld, O'Hurley played J. Peterman, a fictionalized version of catalog-company entrepreneur John Peterman, from 1995 until the show's end in 1998. O'Hurley invested in the relaunch of The J. Peterman Company, and since 1999 has been a part-owner and member of the board of directors.

Dancing with the Stars
He was a contestant on the first season of the television show Dancing with the Stars which aired during the summer of 2005. O'Hurley and his dance partner Charlotte Jørgensen made it to the final competition, which he lost to ABC soap opera star Kelly Monaco.

After fans alleged that Monaco's victory was a set-up, the network announced that O'Hurley, Monaco and their professional dancing partners would face off in a special "grudge match" episode broadcast September 20, 2005. Unlike the first episode, viewer vote solely determined the outcome as opposed to a combination between the three professional judges and the viewer votes.

O'Hurley and Jørgensen emerged as the winners.  The rematch earned $126,000 for Golfers Against Cancer charity. Afterward the duo produced a dance instruction video called, "Learn to Dance with John and Charlotte".

Other roles

O'Hurley made two guest appearances on Baywatch in 1992 and 1994, in two different roles. The first was as villainous yacht club president Fred Adler in "Masquerade," and again as a grieving father named Bill in "Red Wind." In 2003, he played the role of Roger Heidecker on the UPN television series The Mullets.

O'Hurley returned to the Baywatch universe in a 1995 Baywatch Nights episode "Bad Blades," playing the villainous Kemp, in a roller hockey themed episode. He also co-starred on the short-lived sitcom A Whole New Ballgame, had a role as Ralph Stafford on the Murder She Wrote episode "Nailed", and guest-starred in an episode of Drake & Josh.

O'Hurley has been the host of Purina's annual National Dog Show every Thanksgiving since 2002.

In March 2007, he took the lead role in the Wynn Las Vegas's production of Spamalot, in which he plays King Arthur. In July 2008, he reprised his role as King Arthur in the Los Angeles production of Spamalot at the Ahmanson Theatre. In June 2013, he once again reprised the role of King Arthur in Spamalot at The Muny Theater in St. Louis, Missouri. He starred on Broadway and on National Tour as Billy Flynn in Chicago. He has hosted the Mrs. America and Mrs. World Pageants.

He is one of the guest speakers in the Candlelight Processional at Epcot in Walt Disney World. O'Hurley is the voice of the owner of the Cow and Corset bar in the Fable II videogame for the Xbox 360. He also replaced Frank Welker as the "Phantom Blot" for Mickey Mouse Works and Disney's House of Mouse. He has also provided the voice of King Neptune XIV on SpongeBob SquarePants and done voice-over work for radio stations, including WBEN-FM in Philadelphia, KPKX in Phoenix (as "Jim Peakerman"), KMAX in San Francisco (as "J.J. Maxwell"), and WARH in St. Louis (as "Simon Archer"). He is also the voice of Coors Light commercials for more than 10 years.

O'Hurley guest-starred in an episode of The Emperor's New School called "Malina's Big Break", in 1999 as a cult leader in the Family Guy episode "Chitty Chitty Death Bang", and in 2010, guest-starred on Wizards of Waverly Place as Captain Jim-Bob Sherwood.

From 2008 to 2015 he voiced Roger Doofenshmirtz, Heinz Doofenshmirtz's brother, in Phineas and Ferb. He also played in the award-winning 2000x dramatic series produced by the Hollywood Theater of the Ear for National Public Radio.

O'Hurley was a guest star on multiple episodes of the soap opera All My Children during its last month on ABC, in September 2011, playing Kit Sterling, a producer who approaches Erica Kane to make a movie based on the new book she has just written. He previously appeared as Dr. James Grainger in three episodes of The Young and the Restless in 1990, and acted in the soap opera Loving as Keith Lane / Jonathan Matalaine.

In 2015, he had a recurring role as Dr. Christopher Neff on Devious Maids.

He also provided the voice for Victor the Villain on the children's animated TV series Wallykazam!.

Game show host
From 2000 to 2002, he hosted a revival of To Tell the Truth. In 2004, he hosted the limited-run game show The Great American Celebrity Spelling Bee. On September 11, 2006, O'Hurley replaced Richard Karn as the fifth individual to host Family Feud. He hosted the show for four seasons, before departing the show at the beginning of 2010. He was replaced by fellow comedian and film star Steve Harvey. He stated in a 2017 interview with Fox News that he agreed that it became less family-friendly and admitted that as one of the reasons why he left the show. He also said:I got tired of people writing to me saying: 'I can't watch your show. It's a misnomer calling it that because, it's not family. It feels like everything became a penis joke' and I got a little tired of that. I just felt that there are other ways to be more interesting on television and always trying to push that style of family entertainment. I had a great time doing it, but it was time to move on.

On May 13, 1985, 21 years before becoming the host of Family Feud, O'Hurley appeared on a celebrity edition of Family Feud during "Guys & Dolls" Week. This makes him one of only a small number of individuals to have both hosted and been a contestant on the same game show.

Personal life
O'Hurley is a self-taught pianist and classically trained vocalist, and has been composing since his teen years. In 2004, in tandem with cellist Marston Smith, he released a two-album project entitled Peace of Our Minds, a compilation of his original piano compositions. The piece "For Lisa" was written for O'Hurley's wife for their wedding day in 2004. O'Hurley was featured on the March/April 2009 cover of Making Music magazine.

He was married to Eva LaRue from 1992 to 1994. Since August 14, 2004, he has been married to Lisa Mesloh. Together they have a son.

In May 2011, O'Hurley received the Ellis Island Medal of Honor.

O'Hurley identifies politically as a conservative, and is a long time fan of the Boston Red Sox.

Filmography

Film

Television

Video games

Books
 It's Okay to Miss the Bed on the First Jump (2006) (New York Times best-seller)
 Before Your Dog Can Eat Your Homework, First You Have to Do It (2007)
 The Perfect Dog (2013)

Discography
 A medley (with Sarah Rice) of three songs ("You Found Me and I Found You," "Not Yet" and "Before I Met You") from the musical Oh, Lady! Lady!! on Ben Bagley's Jerome Kern Revisited, Vol. II, released 1990
 Peace of Our Minds (double-CD), released 2005
 Secrets from the Lake, released 2008

References

External links

 
 
 

1954 births
Living people
20th-century American male actors
21st-century American male actors
20th-century American comedians
21st-century American comedians
20th-century American singers
21st-century American singers
American game show hosts
American male comedians
American male film actors
American male musical theatre actors
American male soap opera actors
American male television actors
American male voice actors
Beauty pageant hosts
Male actors from Maine
Participants in American reality television series
People from Kittery, Maine
Providence College alumni